The Gârlița Satului is a left tributary of the river Dâmbovița in Romania. It discharges into the Dâmbovița in Nucet.

References

Rivers of Romania
Rivers of Dâmbovița County